Choi Oh-baek (born 20 March 1992) is a South Korean footballer who plays as winger for Mokpo City FC.

Career
He joined Seoul E-Land FC in 2015.

References

External links 
 

1992 births
Living people
South Korean footballers
Association football wingers
Seoul E-Land FC players
K League 2 players
Seongnam FC players
K League 1 players